Galeazzo Marescotti (1 October 1627 – 3 July 1726) was an Italian cardinal.

Biography 
He was born in Vignanello, Italy. His father was named Sforza Marescotti and his mother was Vittoria Ruspoli, both born to prominent aristocratic families of Bologna and Modena. Galeazzo studied in seminary, and after ordination by the age of 23 years was appointed to the papal office of prothonotary apostolic.

From 1661 to 1663 he was governor of Ascoli Piceno. In 1663 he was appointed director of the Congregation of inquisitor Sancti Officii. In 1665 he was promoted to commissioner of the Holy Office of Pope Alexander VII. In 1668 he was appointed Titular Archbishop of Corinth by Pope Clement IX and was sent on a diplomatic mission to Vienna. He was appointed nuncio to Poland. On 4 March 1668, he was consecrated Bishop by Pietro Vidoni, Bishop of Lodi with Giacomo de Angelis, Archbishop of Urbino, and Carlo de' Vecchi, Bishop Emeritus of Chiusi as co-consecrators.

On 13 August 1670 he was appointed apostolic nuncio in Spain by Pope Clement X, and remained at that post in Madrid till 1675. Pope Clement X elevated him to the rank of cardinal in the consistory of 27 May 1675, and assigned him the title of San Bernardo alle Terme. From 1676 to 1679 he was papal governor in Ferrara. In 1679 he was appointed Bishop of Tivoli. In the Cathedral of San Lorenzo, he built for the canons at his own expense a finely worked walnut wood choir and adorned a chapel with colored marble and other ornaments. He reformed the clergy with a new synod. Donated to the cathedral the sum of 500 scudi, with the obligation of an anniversary for the repose of his soul and erected several chapels. In 1684 resigned the bishopric in the hands of Innocent XI . The city was always in the heart, in fact in 1705 he founded the city, at its expense, a monastery for nuns of St. Elizabeth, which finally gave in 1721 the most beautiful and precious furnishings of his private chapel.

In 1681 received the title of Saints Quirico and Giuditta. In 1700 received the title of Santa Prassede. In 1708 he received the title of San Lorenzo in Lucina. On his death he was the oldest member of the College of Cardinals following Cardinal Carpegna (born 1625) who died in 1714 at the age of 88.

Episcopal succession

References

1627 births
1726 deaths
Diplomats of the Holy See
Galeazzo
18th-century Italian cardinals
17th-century Italian Roman Catholic titular archbishops
Bishops of Tivoli
Latin archbishops of Corinth
Inquisitors of Malta
People from the Province of Viterbo